James Carroll (born 21 August 1983) is a former Irish Fianna Fáil politician and was a member of Seanad Éireann from November 2009 to April 2011. He is a former education vice-president and president of the Students' Union in University College Dublin.

Carroll was elected to Louth County Council for Drogheda East at the local elections in June 2009. He succeeded Tony Kett on the Administrative Panel on 26 November 2009 after Kett's death. This was done without a by-election, as he was the only nominated candidate.

Carroll unsuccessfully contested the 2011 general election for the Louth constituency achieving only 8.2% of the vote, and lost his seat in the 2011 Seanad election.

References

1983 births
Living people
Alumni of University College Dublin
Fianna Fáil senators
Local councillors in County Louth
Members of the 23rd Seanad
Politicians from County Louth